Kaykhusraw III or Ghiyāth ad-Dīn Kaykhusraw bin Qilij Arslān (– 1284) was between two and six years old when in 1265 he was named Seljuq Sultan of Rûm. He was the son of Kilij Arslan IV, the weak representative of the Seljuq line who was controlled by the Pervane, Mu’in al-Din Suleyman.

Reign (1265-1284)
Mu’in al-Din Suleyman, empowered by the Mongol khan Abagha, had Kilij Arslan IV executed in 1266. The young Kaykhusraw became no more than a figurehead and played no part in the events of his reign, which were dominated first by the Pervane, the Mongol vizier of Rum and Fakhr al-Din Ali. 

In 1283 Kaykhusraw was co-opted by the Mongol Kangirtay into a revolt against the Ilkhan sovereign Ahmed. Kaykhusraw was executed for his involvement in the rebellion in March 1284. 

Kaykhusraw III was the last Seljuk sultan buried in the dynastic mausoleum at the Alaeddin Camii in Konya.

The throne of Kaykhusraw III
His throne, a fine example of Seljuq woodcarving, survives in the Ethnography Museum of Ankara. It was previously housed in the Kızıl Bey Camii in Ankara.

Sources
Claude Cahen, Pre-Ottoman Turkey: a general survey of the material and spiritual culture and history, trans. J. Jones-Williams, (New York: Taplinger, 1968) 284 ff.
Blue Guide: Turkey  (London: A&C Black, 1995) 602.

External links

Sultans of Rum
Medieval child monarchs
1284 deaths
Year of birth unknown